Venabygd Chapel is a parish church of the Church of Norway in Ringebu Municipality in Innlandet county, Norway. It is located in the village of Venabu. It is an annex chapel for the Venabygd parish which is part of the Sør-Gudbrandsdal prosti (deanery) in the Diocese of Hamar. The brown, wood church was built in a long church design in 1979 using plans drawn up by the architect Odd Østbye. The church seats about 50 people.

History
The parish priest in Ringebu, Simon Dahlen, began the initiative to build a chapel in Venabu, and he put together a committee to help him with the project. Funds were raised from local residents and land owners as well as with business people. Planning began in the 1960s and carried on for about 20 years before the building was completed. The chapel was built on a voluntary basis. The chapel itself is a rectangular building with a turf roof and a small bell tower with an onion-shaped dome with a cross on top. The building was designed by Odd Østbye and the builder was Ole Dalbakk. The new building was consecrated by Bishop Georg Hille on 15 July 1979.

See also
List of churches in Hamar

References

Ringebu
Churches in Sør-Gudbrandsdal Deanery
Churches in Innlandet
Long churches in Norway
Wooden churches in Norway
20th-century Church of Norway church buildings
Churches completed in 1979
1979 establishments in Norway